Ñíguez is a Spanish surname. Notable people with the surname include:

Aarón Ñíguez (born 1989), Spanish footballer, brother of Jonathan and Saúl
Jonathan Ñíguez (born 1985), Spanish footballer, brother of Aarón and Saúl
José Antonio Ñíguez (born 1962), Spanish former footballer, father of Aarón, Jonathan and Saúl
Saúl Ñíguez (born 1994), Spanish footballer, brother of Aarón and Jonathan

Spanish-language surnames